Moonfall is a 2022 science fiction disaster film co-written, directed, and produced by Roland Emmerich. It stars Halle Berry, Patrick Wilson, John Bradley, Michael Peña, Charlie Plummer, Kelly Yu, Carolina Bartczak and Donald Sutherland. It follows two former astronauts alongside a conspiracy theorist who discover the hidden truth about Earth's moon when it suddenly leaves its orbit. Shot in Montreal on a $138–146 million budget, it is one of the most expensive independently produced films ever made.

The film was theatrically released in North America on February 4, 2022, by Lionsgate and Summit Entertainment, and in the United Kingdom on the same day by Entertainment Film Distributors. It was a box-office bomb, grossing only $67 million worldwide, and received mixed-to-negative reviews from critics.

Plot

In 2011, astronauts Brian Harper, Jocinda "Jo" Fowler, and newcomer Alan Marcus are on a Space Shuttle mission to repair a satellite. A mysterious swarm of alien technology attacks the orbiter, killing Alan and knocking Jo unconscious before tunneling into the surface of the Moon. Brian, the only witness to the swarm, returns the crippled shuttle to Earth, but his story is dismissed and he is fired from NASA.

Ten years later, conspiracy theorist K.C. Houseman, who believes that the Moon is an artificial megastructure, secretly uses a research telescope. He discovers that the Moon's orbit is veering closer to Earth, and tries to share his findings with the disgraced Brian. NASA also discovers the anomaly, but K.C. goes public on social media, leading to a global panic. Jo is now NASA's deputy director, launching a spacecraft on an SLS Block 1 rocket to investigate the abnormality. The same alien swarm attacks, killing all three lunar astronauts after they drop a probe into a kilometers-deep artificial shaft that has opened up on the Moon's surface.

As the lunar orbit deteriorates, the Moon falls closer and closer to the Earth, causing seismic and gravitational disturbances. Jo meets former NASA official Holdenfield, who reveals that Brian was discredited due to a NASA coverup dating back to Apollo 11; during the first moon landing, a two-minute radio blackout was meant to conceal evidence of pulsating lights on the surface. Apollo 12 also revealed that the Moon is hollow, and a military EMP device created to kill the swarm was abandoned for budgetary reasons.

With help from her ex-husband General Doug Davidson, Air Force Chief of Staff, Jo requisitions the EMP and rescues retired Space Shuttle Endeavour from a museum to serve the new mission: to correct the Moon's orbit and destroy the swarm. Brian, K.C., and Jo launch with the EMP, narrowly escaping to orbit as a tsunami destroys Vandenberg Air Force Base.

They reach the interior of the Moon, revealed to be a Dyson sphere powered by a white dwarf at its center. The Dyson sphere's AI operating system explains to Brian that billions of years ago, humanity's technologically advanced ancestors were eradicated by a rogue AI; they built the Moon as an Interstellar ark to create and seed life on Earth, but the swarm — one of the malicious AIs — discovered the Moon and is siphoning energy from its power source, destabilizing its orbit.

Meanwhile, Brian's son Sonny, Jo's son Jimmy, and his caretaker Michelle try to reach Doug's military bunker in the Colorado mountains, finding Brian's ex-wife and Sonny's mother Brenda, her husband Tom, and their step-family. Escaping disasters caused by the Moon's proximity and fighting off other survivors, the group finds safety in a mountain tunnel. When his youngest daughter runs out of oxygen, an injured Tom gives her his own, suffocating to death as the Moon strips away the local atmosphere. The president orders a nuclear strike on the approaching Moon, but Doug refuses to comply, with debris collapsing the bunker shortly thereafter, presumably killing Doug and everyone inside.

As the swarm only attacks organic life in the presence of electronic activity, K.C. lures the swarm away from their spacecraft with their lunar module, sacrificing himself to detonate the EMP. Jo and Brian return to Earth, reuniting with their families, and the Moon's power is restored, returning to its regular orbit, but now shed of its rocky exterior. Reconstructing K.C.'s consciousness, the Moon's operating system appears to him as his cat, Fuzz Aldrin, and his mother, remarking that they must now "get started".

Cast

 Halle Berry as Jocinda Fowler, a former NASA astronaut now serving as deputy director of NASA and Brian Harper's colleague who once flew together on a Space Shuttle Endeavour mission
 Patrick Wilson as Brian Harper, a disgraced former NASA astronaut and Jo's colleague who flew on a Space Shuttle Endeavour mission
 John Bradley as K.C. Houseman, an amateur researcher, who finds out about the Moon being artificial and also discovers the incoming Moon impact towards Earth following his contact with an official from an observatory in Chile.
 Michael Peña as Tom Lopez, Brenda's husband
 Charlie Plummer as Sonny Harper, Brian and Brenda's estranged son who was arrested for speeding. Plummer and Dalman additionally portray the manifestation of the Moon's alien operating system as it appears to Brian Harper.
 Azriel Dalman as Sonny as a child
 Kelly Yu as Michelle, a Chinese foreign exchange student who is also the nanny to Jocinda's son Jimmy.
 Donald Sutherland as Holdenfield, a former NASA official who found out about the dark side of the Moon mystery that occurred during Apollo 11 mission. 
 Carolina Bartczak as Brenda Lopez, Brian's ex-wife and Sonny's mother, who currently lives with her new husband Tom.
 Eme Ikwuakor as Doug Davidson, a United States Air Force Four-Star General who served as Chief of Staff of the United States Air Force and deputy director, as well as Jocinda's ex-husband.
 Maxim Roy as Sgt. Gabriella Auclair, a military captain who leads the task-force mission to rescue Brian and Houseman. 
 Frank Schorpion as General Jenkins, a United States Air Force Four-Star General who served as Chairman of the Joint Chiefs of Staff and was tasked by the President of the United States to launch a nuclear strike at the Moon. 
 Stephen Bogaert as NASA Director Albert Hutchings, who turns over his position to Jo at the last minute before the Moon's impact.
 Andreas Apergis as Lt. Colonel Reed, a soldier tasked to deliver an EMP that was to be detonated on the Moon.
 Kathleen Fee as Elaine Houseman, K.C.'s mother who lives at a nursing home and suffers from Alzheimer's disease.

Additionally, Zayn Maloney portrays Jocinda's and Doug's son 10-year old Jimmy, while Ava Weiss and Hazel Nugent portray Brenda's and Tom's 9-year old and 12-year old daughters, Nikki Lopez and Lauren Lopez, respectively.

Production

In May 2019, Roland Emmerich was announced to be writing and directing the film. With a $138–146 million budget (including $40 million from Huayi Brothers, $15 million from Lionsgate Films, and $15 million from Germany), it is one of the most expensive independent films ever produced. Emmerich said the project had previously been bought by Universal Pictures, and once he got the rights back, Emmerich and partner Harald Kloser went to the Cannes Film Festival to get financial backers, with the independent nature helping Emmerich get creative control and a 50% share of the film. The idea came after reading 
Christopher Knight and  Alan Butler's book Who Built the Moon?, which discussed the hollow moon hypothesis, a conspiracy theory about the Moon being an artificial construction, and the script was worked on for four years. In November 2019, Lionsgate and Summit Entertainment acquired the North American distribution rights, and AGC International acquired the international distribution rights.

In May 2020, Josh Gad and Halle Berry were cast, with Patrick Wilson and Charlie Plummer added in June. In October, Stanley Tucci, John Bradley, Donald Sutherland and Eme Ikwuakor were added to the cast, with Bradley replacing Gad due to scheduling conflicts.

Filming began in Montreal in October 2020, after previously being planned for a spring start, and lasted for a total of 61 days. Michael Peña, Carolina Bartczak, Maxim Roy and Stephen Bogaert were added in January 2021, with Peña replacing Tucci in his role due to COVID-19 travel restrictions preventing Tucci from traveling to the production. Due to the COVID-19 pandemic, the film had to speed up its principal photography with an additional $5.6 million spent. Among the pandemic's restrictions were a lack of location shooting, forcing the construction of 135 different sets, built primarily on six stages on Grandé Studios. A museum in Florida contributed an original Space Shuttle cockpit, and NASA provided various data regarding the spacecraft.

1,700 visual effects shots were done for Moonfall, primarily handled by four companies, Scanline VFX, Pixomondo, DNEG and Framestore. Scanline was involved as early as a teaser done during the production of Midway for the Cannes pitch, a shot of the Moon coming up behind the Earth that ended up in the finished film.

Music 
For the recording of the score, composer Thomas Wander returned to Synchron Stage Vienna in the autumn of 2021, where Midway's soundtrack had previously been recorded.

The soundtrack album, containing a total of 23 pieces of music, was released as a download by Atlantic Screen Music/Filmtrax on February 4, 2022.

Release
The film held a premiere in Los Angeles on January 31, 2022. It was released theatrically in the United States on February 4, 2022. It was previously scheduled to be released on October 22, 2021. Despite having been advertised in 2021, the film's theatrical release in Canada was canceled because the local distributor, Mongrel Media, found it too risky to go forward with the release and spend the amount of money required on advertising when it was uncertain whether theaters in Ontario and Quebec, which account for a majority of film sales in the country and were shut down due to the pandemic, would be open in time. The film was released in China on March 25, 2022.

Lionsgate spent approximately $35 million in promotions and advertisements, including $12.2 million on TV ads. Social media monitor RelishMix said online reactions were "mixed to negative" while "awareness stats" were below average. The film had a social media reach of 88.9 million interactions (including 51.1 million views on YouTube) from 31 videos shared online, which featured brand deals with Omega SA and Lexus. RelishMix also said "traction ran thin" and that online audiences "questioned the use of the Space Shuttle which has been out of commission since 2011 and chatted about rumors that the movie was heading straight to Netflix", while Emmerich was drawing backlash "for 'hating the earth'".

The film was released for VOD platforms on April 1, 2022, followed by a Blu-ray, DVD, and 4K UHD release on April 26, 2022 by Lionsgate Home Entertainment.

Reception

Box office
Moonfall grossed $19.1million in the United States and Canada, and $48.2million in other territories, for a worldwide total of $67.3million.

In the United States, Moonfall was released alongside Jackass Forever, and was projected to gross $8–11 million from 3,446 theaters in its opening weekend, with Boxoffice Pro predicting a $9–14 million three-day debut. The film earned $3.4 million on its first day, including an estimated $700,000 from Thursday night previews. Around 300 theaters were closed on Thursday due to a winter storm impacting most of the Midwestern United States. It went on to gross $9.9 million in its opening weekend, finishing second. The film suffered a 70% decline in its second weekend after earning $2.9 million. Moonfall dropped out of the box office top ten in its third weekend with $1.1 million.

Outside the U.S. and Canada, the film grossed an estimated $9.37 million overseas in its opening weekend. It made $9.7 million in its first weekend in China, debuting at the first position by displacing The Batman. The film released in the country when a new wave of the COVID-19 pandemic forced more than half of theaters to close. It retained its position during the following weekend with a gross of $3.2 million. In the third weekend it fell to the fourth place while grossing $900,000.

Critical response
  Audiences polled by CinemaScore gave the film an average grade of "C+" on an A+ to F scale, while those at PostTrak gave it a 66% positive score, with 49% saying they would definitely recommend it.

Future
In January 2022, Emmerich spoke about the possibility of filming two sequels back-to-back if the first film was a success. The following month, star John Bradley said that "if Roland goes down the direction that he wants to", the sequels would be "even more batshit crazy than the first".

References

External links
 
 
 

2022 science fiction action films
2020s disaster films
Apocalyptic films
American disaster films
American science fiction action films
Chinese science fiction action films
Chinese disaster films
British disaster films
British science fiction action films
Canadian disaster films
Canadian science fiction action films
English-language Chinese films
English-language Canadian films
Centropolis Entertainment films
Film productions suspended due to the COVID-19 pandemic
Films about outer space
Films impacted by the COVID-19 pandemic
Films set in 2011
Films set in 2021
Films set in Colorado
Films set in Houston
Films set in Irvine, California
Films set in Los Angeles
Films set in New York City
Films set in Santa Barbara County, California
Films with screenplays by Spenser Cohen
Moon in film
Films about artificial intelligence
Films about astronauts
Films about ancient astronauts
Films about conspiracy theories
Films about extraterrestrial life
Films about the Apollo program
Films set on spacecraft
Films directed by Roland Emmerich
Films scored by Harald Kloser
Films shot in Montreal
Huayi Brothers films
Tencent Pictures films
Lionsgate films
Summit Entertainment films
2020s English-language films
2020s Canadian films
2020s American films
2020s British films
Films set in bunkers